Howard Luck Gossage (1917–1969), frequently referred to as "The Socrates of San Francisco," was an advertising innovator and iconoclast during the "Mad Men" era.   He is known for having said that, "The object of your advertising should not be to communicate with your consumers or your prospects at all but to terrorize your competition's copywriters."

A non-conformist who railed against the norms of so-called scientific advertising in his day, Gossage introduced several innovative techniques to the advertising practice that would only become appreciated decades after his death.

Gossage is credited with introducing the media theorist Marshall McLuhan to media and corporate leaders thereby providing McLuhan his entry into mainstream renown. More widely, Gossage was involved in some of the first environmental campaigning in the USA with the Sierra Club, and in the establishment of Friends of the Earth through his friendship with David Brower.

Co-founder at age 36 of the advertising agency Wiener & Gossage, Howard Gossage is listed by Advertising Age at number 23 of its 100 advertising people of the 20th century. AdAge.com calls Gossage a "copywriter who influenced ad-makers worldwide."

Out of a re-purposed firehouse nestling in San Francisco's old Barbary Shore neighborhood, Gossage created the headquarters of his advertising agency (Freeman, Mander & Gossage). The building would become a salon where many of that era's influential thinkers congregated, from John Steinbeck to Buckminster Fuller, Tom Wolfe to Stan Freberg.

In 2012 the multi-award-winning Creative Director Steve Harrison authored a book about the life of Howard Gossage entitled Changing the world is the only fit work for a grown man.

References 

1917 births
1969 deaths
American marketing people